Pakshipathalam Bird Sanctuary is a Bird Sanctuary and a tourist location in Wayanad district of Kerala state, India.

Brahmagiri Hills
The Karnataka side of Pakshipathalam is called Brahmagiri Hills. This area is also accessible from Irupu Falls in Karnataka.

Etymology
Pakshi means bird in Malayalam.  Pathalam means the underworld of the demons.

Location
Pakshipathalam Bird Sanctuary is located seven kilometers northeast of Thirunelli town.  The hill is 32 kilometers away from the district headquarters of Kalpetta.  The hill lies 1740 m above sea level.
Papanasini River flows from Brahmagiri hill and irrigates the area. This river is believed to have the capacity to wash away all sins as the word 'papa' means sin and 'nashini' means destroy in Malayalam.

Attractions
Pakshi Pathalam is rich in bird diversity.  There is a cave here which is believed to be used by saints of olden times. The undulating hills of Pakshipathalam are also famous as a trekking site.

See also
 Appapara
 Papanasini River
 Iruppu Falls
 Brahmagiri Hills
 Thirunelli temple
 Kattikkulam

References

Bird sanctuaries of Kerala
Tourist attractions in Wayanad district
Mananthavady Area